Penicillium dipodomyicola is a species of the genus of Penicillium which produces peniphenone A, peniphenone B, peniphenone C, peniphenone D, cyclopiazonic acid and patulin.

See also
 List of Penicillium species

References 

dipodomyicola
Fungi described in 2000